Lee Yong-hyun is a Wushu taolu athlete from South Korea.

Career 
Lee made his international debut at the 2014 Asian Games where he won the silver medal in men's daoshu and gunshu. He then competed in the 2015 World Wushu Championships where he won a bronze medal in changquan. His last competition was at the 2017 World Wushu Championships where he was the world champion in gunshu and a silver medalist in duilian with Lee Yong-mun and Lee Ha-sung.

Personal life 
His brother, Lee Yong-mun, is also a highly skilled wushu athlete.

See also 

 List of Asian Games medalists in wushu

References 

Living people
South Korean wushu practitioners
Wushu practitioners at the 2014 Asian Games
Asian Games medalists in wushu
Asian Games silver medalists for South Korea
Medalists at the 2014 Asian Games
1993 births